The Permanent Representative to the North Atlantic Council is the senior member of the United Kingdom's delegation to the North Atlantic Treaty Organization.

Permanent Representatives to the North Atlantic Council
1952–1953: Sir Frederick Hoyer Millar
1953–1957: Sir Christopher Steel
1957–1960: Sir Frank Roberts
1960–1962: Sir Paul Mason
1962–1966: Sir Evelyn Shuckburgh
1966–1970: Sir Bernard Burrows
1970–1975: Sir Edward Peck
1975–1979: Sir John Killick
1979–1982: Sir Clive Rose
1982–1986: Sir John Graham
1986–1992: Sir Michael Alexander
1992–1995: Sir John Weston
1995–2001: Sir John Goulden
2001: Sir David Manning
2001–2003: Sir Emyr Jones Parry
2003–2006: Sir Peter Ricketts
2006–2010: Sir Stewart Eldon
2010–2014: Dame Mariot Leslie
2014–2016: Sir Adam Thomson
2016–2017: Paul Johnston (acting)
2017–2022: Dame Sarah MacIntosh

2022–: David Quarrey

Military Representatives to NATO
Military representatives have included:

Notes

References

External links
United Kingdom Joint Delegation to NATO
NATO Biographies: UK Permanent Representative to NATO
NATO Biographies: Military Representative of the United Kingdom

NATO
 
United Kingdom Permanent Representatives
United Kingdom and NATO
United Kingdom